Beranton Whisenant Jr. (c. 1979 – May 24, 2017) was an American federal prosecutor.

Early life and career 
Whisenant graduated from the University of Florida Law School in 2004. He also studied shortly at the University of Cape Town. He was  admitted to the Florida Bar in 2004 and remained an active member. 

For nine years he worked at a private law firm, Foley & Mansfield Partner, in Miami. At Foley & Mansfield Partner he worked on cases of civil litigation, product liability, contracts, personal injury, wrongful death, and medical malpractice defense. His next job was as Assistant State Attorney in Jacksonville, Florida, his hometown. He joined the United States Attorney's Office in Miami in January 2017. 

He lived in Miramar, Florida a suburb of Miami. He was an active member of the Eleventh Judicial Circuit Professionalism Panel and Chair of The Florida Bar’s Eleventh Judicial Circuit Grievance Committee in Division ‘L. He was a member of the William Reece Smith Jr. Leadership Academy as well as a member of The Florida Bar’s Judicial Nominations Procedure committee and of the Florida Supreme Court’s Commission on Professionalism. He was a guest teacher at the University of Miami Paralegal Program and the University of Miami School of Law and Florida Coastal School of Law. Whisenant volunteered at Habitat for Humanity and volunteered as a lawyer, for pro bono legal work.

U.S. Attorney
Beranton Whisenant worked in the U.S. Attorney's Office in Miami in its major crimes unit. The office prosecutes criminal and civil cases from Fort Pierce to Key West. He was reportedly working on visa and passport fraud cases prior to his death.

Death
A passerby on a beach in Miami, Florida found Whisenant's corpse floating in the water with possible head trauma or possible head gunshot wounds at 6:30 AM on May 25, 2017. He was wearing a dress shirt and black pants. Hollywood police detectives initially were unsure whether the death was a homicide, suicide, or something else. All of Whisenant's personal effects were on his body, so robbery was ruled out as a motive. 

Whisenant was 37 years old, and had been a U.S. Attorney for only five months. His memorial service was held on June 1, 2017 at Antioch Missionary Baptist Church in Miami. Whisenant left behind three children, his wife, Ebony, a doctor and teacher at Florida International University’s medical school, and his parents, both Jacksonville physicians.

The U.S. attorney’s office and the Federal Bureau of Investigation (FBI) determined that his death had no connection to his employment as a prosecutor or his federal criminal cases, leaving the death investigation to the Hollywood Police Department. Hollywood police and the Broward medical examiner’s office declined numerous public records requests on Whisenant’s death, which was determined to be a suicide.

The lack of information from authorities about his death opened the door for hypotheses.

References 

20th-century births
2017 deaths
University of Florida alumni
Florida Democrats
Suicides by firearm in Florida